DP may refer to:

In arts and entertainment

Film, television, and theatre
 Danny Phantom, an animated television series
 David Production, a Japanese animation studio
 Director of photography, a job in filmmaking
 Digital Playground, an American pornographic movie studio
 Dixon Place, a theater organization in New York City
 D.P., a South Korean series

Music
 Daft Punk, an electronic band
 Dead Poetic, a music group
 Deep Purple, a rock music group
 Dominant parallel
 Drowning Pool, an American heavy metal music group
 dp (album), a 2005 album by Daniel Powter

Other media
 Daily Pennsylvanian, the University of Pennsylvania's student newspaper
 Deadpool, a Marvel Comics comic book character
 Display picture or avatar, in gaming and online, a graphical representation of a user or their character
 Doom Patrol, a comic book series
 H. G. Wells, author; used "D. P." as a pseudonym
Dan Patrick, American Sportscaster and radio personality, host of The Dan Patrick Show.  Universally known as DP according to Dan Hepp. 
Dark Prince from Clash Royale

Businesses and organizations
 Democratic Party (disambiguation), a name shared by many political parties
 Democrazia Proletaria, a former left-wing political party in Italy
 The Detroit Partnership, a service-learning organization at the University of Michigan
 Deutsche Partei, a German political party
 Distributed Proofreaders, an organisation related to Project Gutenberg
 Dorset Police, the territorial police force responsible for policing Dorset, England
 First Choice Airways, formerly Air 2000 (IATA airline code DP 1987-2008)
 Pobeda Airlines  (IATA airline code DP since 2014)
 Digipen Institute of Technology
 DP World, a logistics company based in the United Arab Emirates

Law
 Death penalty
 Due process

Science, technology, and mathematics

Computing and software
 DP (complexity), or difference polynomial time, a computational complexity class
 Data processing
 Software design pattern, a reusable solution to a common problem in software design
 Device-independent pixel, a unit representing an abstraction of a pixel for use by an application
 Digital Performer, an audio software package for the Apple Macintosh and Windows
 DisplayPort, a computer display interface specification
 Double Parity, as used in RAID-DP, a non-standard implementation of RAID
 Dual processors, a computing component with two independent processing units 
 Dynamic positioning, a computer-controlled system to maintain a vessel's position and heading

Mathematics
 Davis–Putnam algorithm, for checking the validity of a first-order logic formula
 Differential privacy, a system for publicly sharing information while withholding information about individuals in the dataset
 Dirichlet process, a stochastic process corresponding to an infinite generalization of the Dirichlet distribution.
 Dynamic programming, a method for solving a complex problem by breaking it down into a collection of simpler subproblems, used in several fields
 Number of decimal places that a number is given to

Medicine
 Delusional parasitosis, in which individuals incorrectly believe they are infested with parasites
 Depersonalization disorder, a state of persistently feeling detached and/or out of one's body
 Dermal papilla, a cluster of mesenchymal cells that lie at the base of a hair follicle
 Diphallia, in which a male is born with two penises
 Disopyramide

Weapons
 Degtyaryov machine gun (Degtyarova pekhotnyi), a Soviet machine gun
 Drill purpose rifle, a rifle that has been altered so that it can be used for drill purposes only
 Dual purpose gun, a naval artillery mounting designed to engage both surface and air targets

Other uses in science and technology
 Data point, a unit of measurement or observation
 Diametral pitch, the ratio of the number of teeth in a gear to its pitch diameter
 Degree of polymerization, the number of units in an average polymer chain at a given time during a reaction
 Determiner phrase, in linguistics
 Diffraction pattern, in wave mechanics
 Diffusion pump, a type of vacuum pump
 Standard instrument departure procedure, an outbound procedure for aircraft
 Diphosgene, also called as DP for a chemical warfare agent

In sport
 Deportivo Pereira, a Colombian soccer team
 Designated player (softball), a softball batter
 Designated Player Rule, in Major League Soccer
 Double play, in baseball
 Daytona Prototype, a type of racing car used in the Rolex Sports Car Series and United SportsCar Championship
 Dude Perfect, a trick shot conglomerate
 Dan Patrick, in broadcasting

Other uses
 Delegable proxy, a form of voting whereby some members of a decision-making body may delegate their voting power to other members
 Delivery point, in postal systems
 Depersonalization, a state of feeling detached and/or out of one's body
 Depository participant, an agent of the depository, in Indian banking
 Dill pickle, a type of pickled cucumber
 Displaced person, a person who has been forced to leave his or her home or place of habitual residence, first prevalently used in aftermath of WWII 
 Divine Principle, the main theological book of the Unification Church
 Donkey punch, slang for a sexual practice 
 Double penetration, a variant of group sex
 Down payment
 Dr. Pepper, a type of carbonated soft drink
 Station code for Depok railway station

See also
DPS (disambiguation)
Dawn patrol (disambiguation)
₯, symbol for currency Greek drachma
∂P, an abbreviation for differentiable programming